The Ministry of Budget (French: ministère du Budget) is a Guinean Ministry tasked with optimizing Guinean budget policy and improving fiscal and customs administration to secure revenue and qualify public spending. The most recent minister is Moussa Cissé.

Organization 
The Ministry is headed by the Minister of Budget. The Minister presides over a Cabinet as well as a General Secretariat. Two people, each leading a different component of the Ministry's functioning, are directly responsible to the Minister: the Secretary General (in charge of the Executive branch of the Ministry) and the Chef de Cabinet (responsible for the administrative branch).

The Executive branch contains:National Directorates, General Directorates and Non-central Services, including: 

 The National Tax Directorate
 The National Budget Directorate
 The National Directorate of Data Processing Systems
 the National Directorate of Accounting

 The General Directorate of Customs
 The General Directorate of the Office of Strategy and Development

 The Regional Inspectorate of Customs
 The Regional Inspectorate of Taxes
 The Prefectural Section of Customs
 The Prefectural Section of Budget
 The Prefectural Section of Taxes
 The Communal Section of Taxes   

The Administrative branch contains:the Cabinet and Auxiliary Services, including:

 The Principal Advisor
 The Advisor charged with Spending Quality
 The Advisor charged with Public Finance Reform & Relations with Technical and Financial partners
 The Advisor charged with Mission
 The Fiscal Advisor 
 The Legal Advisor

 The Capacity Building Service
 The Documentary Resource and Archival Service 
 The Communication Service
 The Gender and Equity Service
 The Division of Financial Affairs 
 The Division of Human Resources
 The General Inspectorate
 The Central Secretariat
 Linked Services

Ministers of Budget since 2010

References 

Politics of Guinea
Government ministries of Guinea